William Gifford Johnston (16 January 1901 – 1964) was a Scottish professional footballer, who played as an inside forward for Huddersfield Town, Stockport County, Manchester United, Macclesfield Town, Oldham Athletic and Frickley.

Johnston won the Football League First Division Championship with Huddersfield Town in 1923–24 (8 appearances in the campaign). He played for Manchester United in the First Division and returned in the 1931–32 season following their relegation to the Second Division, after two seasons at Macclesfield. In later years Johnston moved to Frickley, taking on the roles of manager and club secretary as well as player and played a large role in securing the future of the football club in 1936.

References

http://www.stretfordend.co.uk/playermenu/johnston.html
Official Frickley Athletic Museum website – Billy Johnston Collection
https://archive.today/20141104230204/http://www.frickleyathleticmuseum.co.uk/billy-johnston
Silkmen Archives
https://web.archive.org/web/20161024104502/http://www.silkmenarchives.org.uk/player_profiles/Players/j.html

1901 births
1964 deaths
Date of death missing
Scottish footballers
Footballers from Edinburgh
Association football inside forwards
English Football League players
Huddersfield Town A.F.C. players
Stockport County F.C. players
Manchester United F.C. players
Macclesfield Town F.C. players
Oldham Athletic A.F.C. players
Frickley Athletic F.C. players
Dalkeith Thistle F.C. players
Selby Town F.C. players
Scottish Junior Football Association players